Trifolium lappaceum, the burdock clover, is a species of annual herb in the family Fabaceae. They have a self-supporting growth form and compound, broad leaves.

Sources

References 

lappaceum
Flora of Malta